Nanton is the district capital of the Nanton District in the Northern Region of Ghana.

References 

Communities in Ghana